Benke Diarouma (born 12 August 1996) is a Malian basketball player, who plays for AS Police and the Mali national basketball team.

Professional career
Diarouma was born in Bamako. Since 2018, Diarouma plays for AS Police in the Malian Ligue 1. In the 2017–18 season, he was named the MVP of the season.

National team career
Diarouma played with Mali at FIBA AfroCan 2019 and FIBA AfroBasket 2021.

References

External link
Benke Diarouma at Eurobasket.com

Sportspeople from Bamako
AS Police basketball players
Centers (basketball)
Malian men's basketball players

1996 births
Living people